"Pour moi la vie va commencer" is a song by French singer Johnny Hallyday. It was released in 1963.

Commercial performance 
The song spent three consecutive weeks at no. 1 on the singles sales chart in France (from 28 December 1963 to 17 January 1964).

Charts

References

External links 
 Johnny Hallyday – "Pour moi la vie va commencer" (EP) at Discogs

1963 songs
1963 singles
Johnny Hallyday songs
Philips Records singles
Number-one singles in France
Song articles with missing songwriters